Florica Bucur (born 18 May 1959) is a Romanian former rower who competed in the 1980 Summer Olympics.

References

External links 
 
 
 

1959 births
Living people
Romanian female rowers
Olympic rowers of Romania
Rowers at the 1980 Summer Olympics
Olympic bronze medalists for Romania
Olympic medalists in rowing
Medalists at the 1980 Summer Olympics